Leszek Podhorodecki (1934 – 7 December 2000) was a Polish historian and writer. A secondary school teacher, he published over 40 different books about the history of Poland, as well as dozens of academic articles and other publications.

Bibliography
Chanat krymski i jego stosunki z Polską w XV-XVIII wieku
Chocim 1621
Dzieje rodu Chodkiewiczów
Hetman Jan Karol Chodkiewicz 1560-1621
Hetman Jan Zamoyski 1542-1605
Hetman Stanisław Koniecpolski ok. 1591-1646
Hetman Żółkiewski
Historia Polski 1796-1997
Kulikowe Pole 1380
Lepanto 1571
Rapier i koncerz
Sicz Zaporoska
Sławne bitwy Polaków
Sławni hetmani Rzeczypospolitej
Sobiescy herbu Janina
Stefan Czarniecki
Tatarzy
Wazowie w Polsce
Wiedeń 1683
Władysław IV 1595-1648
Zarys dziejów Ukrainy

References

External links
 Short bio
 List of publications

External links
Battle of CHOCIM 1673, anon. extract from Leszek Podhorodecki "Sławne bitwy Polaków"  Mada 1997, translated by Rick Orli, 2006

1934 births
2000 deaths
20th-century Polish historians
Polish male non-fiction writers
20th-century Polish male writers